In mathematics, Esenin-Volpin's theorem states that weight of an infinite compact dyadic space is the supremum of the weights of its points.

References

 
 
 

General topology
Theorems in topology